Bawdeswell is a small rural village and civil parish in Norfolk, England. At the time of the 2011 census it had a population of 828 and an area of 487 hectares. For the purposes of local government it falls within the Upper Wensum Ward of Breckland District Council and the Elmham and Mattishall Division of Norfolk County Council. It is on a Roman road that ran east–west between Durobrivae near modern Peterborough and Smallburgh, crossing the Fen Causeway.

The village is recorded in the Domesday Book as Balderwella. It was the home of Chaucer's Reeve in The Reeve's Prologue and Tale in the Canterbury Tales.

Its parish church, All Saints', was rebuilt after its Victorian church was destroyed in World War II when hit by a crashing de Havilland Mosquito bomber.

Toponymy
The village name appears to be unique, with no other example being found by internet searches, and has been spelt as Baldereswella, Baldeswell, Badswell, Bawsewella and Baldeswelle – in 1807 it was officially Baldeswell. The exact meaning of the name of the village is uncertain.  However, wella is a well, 'stream' or 'spring', and it is clear that there has always been water here with quite a number of wells still surviving, the water table being  or less. Baldhere is an Anglo-Saxon man's name, composed of Old English elements meaning 'bold, strong' and 'army', and may date back before the 7th century. In Norse it was a mythological son of the God Odin and in Swedish meant 'The God of Light'. The name of the village may thus stem from the Old English given name Baldhere and refers to a source of water belonging to or possibly discovered by him. Therefore, an original spelling may have been Baldhereswella.  In his An Essay towards a Topographical History of the County of Norfolk: volume 8, historian, social and landscape geographer Francis Blomefield considers the meaning of balder could be quick running water and ascribes the same meaning to Boldre, Hampshire and Baldersdale, North Yorkshire.

Geography
Bawdeswell Village is situated almost in the centre of Norfolk on the northeastern boundary of Breckland District. The main area of the village is situated immediately to the north of the A1067 road but there are also a few dwellings to the south of the A1067 on Dereham Road, Billingford Road and Elsing Lane. There is also a small amount of development on Reepham Road to the North of the village.

Bawdeswell is close to the village of Foxley and to Foxley Wood which is a Site of Special Scientific Interest (SSSI) and the largest remaining area of ancient woodland in Norfolk, England.

Bawdeswell Parish is adjacent to the Parishes of Foxley to the North, Bylaugh and Sparham to the south, Billingford to the west and Reepham to the east.

Six roads meet at the settlement. From the northwest the road from Fakenham and from the southeast the road from Norwich (A1067). From the west the road from King's Lynn via Litcham and North Elmham and from the east the road from Mundesley on the coast via Aylsham and Reepham (B1145). From the southwest the road from Dereham via Swanton Morely. Lastly the road south to Elsing that starts as Elsing Lane and after reaching Elsing meanders through various lanes to places south such as North Tuddenham and Mattishall.

History
Bawdeswell is sited on a Roman road that ran from Durobrivae near modern Peterborough, across the Fen Causeway to Denver, followed Fincham Drove and crossed Peddars Way between Castle Acre and Swaffham, thence towards North Elmham and Billingford, to Bawdeswell and Jordans Green, and on to Smallburgh. It was a major east–west route and possibly continued via the large Roman settlement at Brampton to Caister or an important port since eroded by the sea. Some Neolithic and Anglo Saxon artefacts found in Bawdeswell are listed by Norfolk Museums and Archaeology Service. An excavation at The Gables in 1998 revealed a variety of items from prehistoric to post medieval including Roman pot sherds and evidence of Roman field boundary ditches. The village is mentioned in the Domesday Book of 1086 as Balderwella and again in the 'Norwich Domesday Book' of 1291. Alfheah and Godric held Bawdeswell ffom Count Alan, with thirteen freemen, three and a half ploughs, meadow, woodland and ten pigs recorded. 
Evidence has been found of a church here since about 1100.

Bawdeswell was the home of Chaucer's Reeve in The Reeve's Prologue and Tale in the Canterbury Tales from which the village magazine 'The Reeve's Tale' gets its name. He was "Osewald the Reeve", "''Of Northfolk was this reeve of which I telle, Byside a toun men callen Baldeswelle".

There were four coaching inns and a toll gate on a turnpike. It was a busy stopping off point for the changing of horses and coaches, including the mail coach, for travellers including Walsingham pilgrims. As with many villages, all the original pubs closed, mostly in the 1920s, but the Bell Inn stayed until 1970 when it was closed and converted into flats.

The buildings of the tollhouse and of the four original public houses are now residential dwellings within the conservation area of the village. The tollhouse was built in about 1823 and by the 21st century was semi-derelict but in 2002 work commenced to restore and extend it as a residential dwelling now known as Tollgate Cottage. Chaucer House is reputedly the oldest building in the village dating to the 14th or 15th century and up until 1920 was The Crown Inn (previously Bear Inn) after which it was Crown Farm (farmhouse) before being given its current name. The Ram Inn closed in 1929 and is now a private house 'The Willows'.

Conservation area
The centre of the village has been preserved by the creation of a conservation area in 1975. Breckland District has some 50 Conservation areas in 45 of its 112 parishes.

All Saints' Church
There has been a parish church on this site since circa 1100, but there are no records before 1313 when the current list of some 58 rectors begins. All Saints is believed to be the only Norfolk village church destroyed in World War II, having been hit by an RAF Mosquito bomber from 608 Squadron at RAF Downham Market that crashed in the village in November 1944. Sadly, both the crew perished, and there is a memorial plaque in the church made from aircraft parts by John Ames (PCC Secretary 1972–1980 and Churchwarden 1980–1994).

The Church was replaced with one of Neo-Georgian design by architect J Fletcher Watson.

Bawdeswell is one of 13 parishes in the Heart of Norfolk benefice. which includes Billingford, Bintree, Foulsham, Foxley, Guestwick, Guist, North Elmham, Stibbard, Themelthorpe, Twyford, Wood Norton and Worthing. The parish finances are ably supported by 'The Friends of Bawdeswell Church', who with various fund raising events and appeals, contribute towards the maintenance of the church fabric and the cost of heating and insuring it.

Mosquito Crash of 1944
At 20:45 on 6 November 1944, Mosquito KB-364 of No. 608 Squadron RAF crashed in the village tearing down electricity cables on Reepham Road and setting All Saints' Church alight and inflicting significant damage on Barwick House and Chaucer House opposite. Firefighters from the Dereham Fire Brigade and the American contingent at RAF Attlebridge eventually brought the blaze under control after four hours. It is believed that the Mosquito 'iced up' on the return from a diversionary air-raid on Gelsenkirchen whilst attempting to return to RAF Downham Market. Both crew members were killed in the crash and are commemorated by a plaque in the new Bawdeswell Church. The two pilots are listed as:
 Pilot Officer James McLean (1918-1944)
 Sergeant Mervyn L. Tansley (1923-1944)

Places of Interest
Bawdeswell Hall is a Dutch gabled building dating from 1683. Originally built by a Henry Eglinton it is now owned by the Gurney family. Gurney's Bank was based in Norwich and connected through marriage to Barclays Bank of London with which it merged along with Backhouse's Bank of Darlington and several other Provincial banks in 1896 to form what is now Barclays Bank. Elizabeth Fry, the famous prison reformer, was born a Gurney, and the portrait from which the image previously on the reverse of the £5 note was taken hangs on the main staircase in the hall.

Chaucer House is reputed to be the oldest surviving building in the village. It was quite badly damaged in the plane crash which destroyed the Church in 1944.

Bawdeswell Workhouse was erected in about 1781 as a workhouse for the Bawdeswell Gilbert Union, serving the parishes of Bawdeswell, Billingford, Bintree, Bylaugh, Foxley, Lyng, and Sparham. The building was no longer required when the new Gressenhall workhouse was built in 1835 to serve all the parishes in the new Mitford and Launditch Union. The building was then used as a school. It later became a bakery and shop with a blacksmiths shop in outbuildings and an early petrol pump outside, a pub and a private dwelling.

Bawdeswell Village Hall was moved from the centre of the village on the site of what is now five houses at Old Woods Green to the recreation ground north of the village in the early 1990s. A modern steel and timber structure was designed but was only one third completed with available funding and the actual hall was not built. It had a high pitched roof and the original plan was for there to be a badminton court in the main hall. Despite these adversities, the hall had reasonable facilities and was well used, but its size restricted it to one activity at a time. A new larger hall was initially planned through Project Bawdeswell but this was taken over by the Village Hall Committee. A new community hall with a larger hall and two further activity rooms, improved toilet, kitchen and storage facilities and an outside patio area, has been built with help from the Big Lottery Fund.

Bawdeswell Recreation Grounds includes a football pitch, a basketball/short tennis court and a play area which was rebuilt in 2010.

Bawdeswell Heath is all that remains of a huge area of common land following the inclosure acts in the late 18th and early to mid 19th centuries. The Heath is administered by a board of trustees except for  administered by the Parish Council as trustees.

Adam's Pit is a small pond/wildlife sanctuary situated at the junction of Dereham Road and Paradise Lane immediately to the north of the A1067 road. It is held in trust by the Parish Council and has recently been transformed from a muddy overgrown pond to a well-managed wildlife conservation area. Financial assistance has been received from Norfolk County Council who have also given advice. The origin of its name is unknown.

Schools

A free school for twelve boys from Bawdeswell and eight from Foxley was endowed by John Leeds esq. in 1728.

From about 1828 there was a school in The Old Workhouse building with up to seventy pupils.
The current village primary school was built in 1875 for Bawdeswell, Bylaugh and Foxley at the sole expense of the Rev Henry Lombe of Bylaugh Hall, who was the Lord of the Manor. His family crest is on the front with the motto "PROPOSITI TENAX" (Firm of Purpose). The school had a roll of 100 as of May 2016. Arrangements are now in hand for the school to join the 'Synergy Multi Academy Trust' headed by Reepham School by spring 2017.

Most secondary school children attend Reepham High School.

Village development
There has been significant development in the village in the last few decades. The population had declined from 410 at the 1891 census to 331 in 1971 increasing to 574 in 1981, 652 in 1991, 766 in 2001 (all census figures) and to 828 in the 2011 census. This increase was in no small way due to the development of the Hall Road and Two Fields Way area plus Paradise Road. Since 2000 the developments at Saxon Meadows, All Saint's Court and Chaucers Heath (Reeve's Close) plus other infill have added at least 24 new houses and the redevelopment of the sheltered housing accommodation at Folland Court completed in August 2009 has seen eight larger family houses built. There is considerable opposition within the village to any further large scale development, especially of sixty or so houses on the site near Two Fields Way proposed by the 'Gladedale Group', expressed at the Annual Parish Meeting in May 2007, and the draft Breckland Local Development Framework (LDF) has not listed Bawdeswell for any significant development. Recently, planning permission has been granted for 2 more houses in Saxon Meadows.

Parish Council Policy has been to resist attempts to make Bawdeswell an LSC (Local Service Centre) and to opt for minor development only within the existing development boundary and to accept two small sites to be included in a minor adjustment of the settlement boundary. Breckland Council's Core Strategy which does not list Bawdeswell as an LSC or for any significant development has been broadly accepted by The Planning Inspectorate in their report. and was adopted on 17 December 2009.

The Breckland LDF Task & Finish Group examined ten site specific submissions for the village and rejected all of them.

A development of some 40 houses on a site off Hall Road now known as Bluebell Rise was completed in early 2021. This development means that the village has virtually tripled in size since the 1961 census.

Bawdeswell has now been identified as a 'Local Service Centre' in the draft Breckland District Council Local Plan. This plan shows that no further large developments will be required in the foreseeable future as the site shown for development has been completed with 40 houses compared with the required 30 up to 2036.

Transport
Bawdeswell is situated on the X29 bus route between Norwich and Fakenham with a regular daytime service. Norwich railway station is  distant by road. There is a service to and from London and frequent trains to Cambridge, Great Yarmouth and Lowestoft, Cromer and Sheringham plus a cross country service to Liverpool. A community car scheme for transport to medical appointments is run by the Parish Council with financial assistance from Breckland Council.

Governance
The parish council consists of seven councillors and a parish clerk. The council has ten meetings each year.

The election for the seven parish councillors due to be held on Thursday 2 May 2019, was uncontested as there were only six nominees and the Returning Officer declared that these six were elected. The remaining position has been filled by co-option.

Westminster – The village is part of the Mid Norfolk Parliamentary Constituency, the Member of Parliament being George Freeman (politician) (Conservative). The last election was held on 12 December 2019.

Norfolk County Council – Bawdeswell is in the Elmham and Mattishall Division and the councillor is Bill Borrett (Conservative). The last election was held in May 2017 and elections are held every four years.

Breckland District Council – Bawdeswell was until May 2015 part of Eynsford ward but following the 2015 changes to electoral boundaries is now in a new 'Upper Wensum' ward with 2 councillors – Gordon Bambridge (Conservative) and Bill Borrett (Conservative) elected. The last election was held on 2 May 2019 and elections are held every four years.

War Memorial
Bawdeswell's War Memorial is a brass plaque in All Saints' Church. It holds the following names for the First World War:
 Lance-Corporal Albert Tooley (1893-1917), 10th Battalion, Essex Regiment
 Lance-Corporal Frederick Riseborough (1895-1916), 5th Battalion, Northumberland Fusiliers
 Bombadier Richard Johnson (d.1917), 120th Siege Battery, Royal Garrison Artillery
 Private Edmund Mortimer (d.1917), 7th Battalion, Bedfordshire Regiment
 Private James Walker (1890-1918), 387th Company, Labour Corps
 Private George H. Bugdale (1894-1917), 8th Battalion, South Lancashire Regiment
 Private Charles Hatley (d.1916), 1st Battalion, Royal Norfolk Regiment
 Private Percy Wright (d.1914), 1st Battalion, Royal Norfolk Regiment
 Private Russell W. Tooley (1896-1915), 7th Battalion, Royal Norfolk Regiment
 Private Walter Johnson (d.1917), 9th Battalion, Royal Norfolk Regiment
 Private Roydon F. T. Rix (1893-1915), 9th Battalion, Royal Norfolk Regiment
 Alfred E. Baker
 Frederick Clarke
 James Curry
 Stanley Sadler

And, the following for the Second World War:
 Private Colin E. Johnson (1919-1944), Royal Army Ordnance Corps
 Private George H. Parke (1923-1943), Royal Army Ordnance Corps

Notes

External links

Photos of Bawdeswell and surrounding area on geograph
Genuki on Bawdeswell

Villages in Norfolk
Civil parishes in Norfolk
Breckland District